Gaglianico is a comune (municipality) in the Province of Biella in the Italian region Piedmont, located about  northeast of Turin and about  southeast of Biella.

Gaglianico borders the following municipalities: Biella, Candelo, Ponderano, Sandigliano, Verrone.

Twin towns — sister cities
Gaglianico is twinned with:

  Nova Gorica, Slovenia
  Estella-Lizarra, Spain
  Deta, Romania

People
 Andrea Zanchetta (born 2 February 1975), footballer.

References

Cities and towns in Piedmont